Ruamrudee International School (RIS) is an international school in Min Buri District, Bangkok, Thailand. It is an international school for students in pre-school - grade 12 incorporated under the laws of the Kingdom of Thailand as a non-profit organization. Founded in 1957 by the Redemptorist Fathers of Thailand, RIS serves a population of 1,400 students from around the world. Other campuses include Ruamrudee International School Early Years Campus (Phraya Suren Road, Ramintra-Kanchanapisek area) and Ruamrudee International School Ratchapruek Campus (Bang Kruai-Sai Noi Road, Bang Krang, Nonthaburi).

Administrators
School director: Fr. Jittapol Plangklang C.Ss.R

High school
HS Principal: Dr. Jim O'Malley 
HS Assistant Principal:

High school club
Amnesty International
Butterfly Effect
Eco-Merits
Habitat for Humanity 
History Bee & Bowl
Leo Club
Model United Nations (MUN)
Muse Art and Music Club
National Honor Society (NHS)
Operation Smile
Red Cross
Student Council
Soi Dog
Tech Club
EducatoryX
Cooking Committee (Dissolved)

Middle school
Middle school principal: Ms. Madeleine Bystrom
ES/MS assistant principal:

Elementary school
Elementary school principal: Madeleine Bystrom
ES/MS Assistant Principal:

History
Ruamrudee International School (RIS) was founded in 1957 by a group of Redemptorist priests of Holy Redeemer Church with help from expatriate parishioners and a handful of local Thai students. The school began as the two classrooms for children of expatriates in the Holy Redeemer School and was given its current name when it moved into its own building in 1963. In 1966, it changed from the British to the American system. In August 1992, the school moved to a 14-acre campus in the suburban district of Minburi.  The school has been ranked among the top five international schools in Thailand.

RIS was one of the first schools in Asia to be accredited by the Western Association of Schools and Colleges (WASC) and the Thai Ministry of Education. RIS is also a member of the East Asia Regional Council of Overseas Schools (EARCOS) and the Council of International Schools (CIS).

Ruamrudee is Thai for "union of hearts," which captures the school's vision of welcoming all children into an environment of care and compassion. RIS attempts to utilize a progressive, innovative approach to education; emphasizing on global citizenship and character development in a multicultural community.

Curriculum
RIS offers a college preparatory American curriculum. It is accredited by the Western Association of Schools and Colleges (WASC), the Thai Ministry of Education, and the Association of Indian Universities. RIS is also a member of the East Asia Regional Council of Overseas Schools (EARCOS) and the Council of International Schools (CIS). It is certified to award the International Baccalaureate diploma since May 1998, and the traditional US high school diploma. It also offers advanced placement credits. Being a Catholic school, Ruamrudee offers monthly mass on the first Thursday of each month from 7:30 - 8:00, as well a religion course in Middle and High school.

Facilities
RIS is equipped with a 100-meters by 50-meters FIFA-certified artificial turf football pitch, an Olympic sized swimming pool and a normal pool, multiple gymnasiums, two libraries, a performing arts center, multiple mini-theaters, an art gallery, and computer and science labs.

Libraries
RIS features two main libraries, Elizabeth and Griffith. The two libraries contain more than 100,000 print, electronic, and audiovisual materials. Each library is supported by a knowledgeable, certified librarian and staff along with quiet study locations for students.

The Elizabeth library caters to PreK–grade 5 students with books and resources on topics ranging from general interest to contemporary popular fiction. ES students are encouraged to search for engaging books at just the right reading level to support their literacy development. The library provides many kid-friendly genres and titles crucial to their development. Middle school and high school students, however, prefer to use the Griffith library as it provides greater space for working and a greater variety of books.

The Griffith Library serves grade 6–12 students, with well over 50,000 books, 70 periodicals, and multiple online resources that span an enormous range of fiction, nonfiction, and reference materials.

Currently, the Griffith library is undergoing renovation with an expected completion date of January 2020. A temporary location for the library has been established in an existing 'book room' near the tennis court. The library features two floors with the second also being used for the class, Academic Research, instructed by librarian, Mr. Garrett Drake. The library also provides the students with board games.

Gym
RIS offers free gym access to students and faculties. The gym is equipped with multiple cardio machines including treadmills, cycling machine, step machine, etc. Furthermore, multiple sets of weights and weight machines for upper body and lower body exercise are available. Students who seek to use the gym must be dresses in gym-appropriate clothing. A water dispenser is available within the gym, however, the gym does not provide cups. Students and faculties are expected to provide themselves with water containers. Although water fountains are located throughout the campus. The closest one is located outside the building itself.

Performing Arts Center (PAC)
The 300-seat, tiered Performing Arts Center (PAC) is where students present their band, choir, drama, and musical productions. The PAC is a space for showcasing student and faculty talent shows, the annual Easter and Christmas performances, and the TEDxYouth talks. The theater features a proscenium stage with mirrored practice rooms and two dressing rooms. The PAC has been used for the school's adaptation of musicals such as Bye Bye Birdie, Legally Blonde, and Once on This Island. Seasonal choirs showings are hosted throughout the year. Band performances are hosted throughout the year to present the progression band classes in school.

The Nest (CPD Room)
The Nest, previously known as the CPD room, is a conference room located above the high school portion of the canteen. Access to the room are located at the stair located in the canteen or through the second floor bridge on the second floor of the high school building. The octagonal room features rhombus-shaped tables that can be combined to create a hexagonal table. The Nest is often used for conferences and retreats for events such as Student Council or National Honors Society.

Maker Space/Middle School Workshop
The middle school workshop or the maker space is a place for students to explore themselves with new technology and workshop equipment. Students who seek to explore the field of STEM can take advantage of equipments such as 3d printers and wide screen TVs. Those who seek to engage in hands-on activities may enjoy exploring the workshop portion of the space. Equipments such as saws, hammer, nails, wooden planks, and other.

Prior to the school year of 2017 - 2018, the maker space did not contain equipments of the same sort. Previously, the maker space provided students with games and gadgets such as connect four, jenga, knex, and perler beads. Although a 3d printer was available for use in the beginning, the machine had restricted usage.

Pools
RIS boasts two pools: Phoenix pool measures 25m x 50m—officially Olympic size and concurrent with FINA standards; Godbout pool, a 25m pool, has an automatic salt-chlorination filter system. The Phoenix pool went through upgrades such as PVC lining, starter blocks for both short- and long-course events, a synthetic rubber pool deck, a scoreboard, a timing system with highly sensitive touchpads, and sails extending across the entire pool.

Mini-Theater (Redeemer)
The Mini-Theater, located on the 6th floor of Redeemer building, is a small movie theater used for showing of movies or videos. The theater capacity of 20 people limits it for in-class use rather than school-wide use.

School Location
Bangkok : Main Campus in Minburi Campus : (RIS)
RUAMRUDEE INTERNATIONAL SCHOOL EARLY YEARS CAMPUS : Ramintra-Kanchanapisek : (RISE)
RIS Ratchapruek : (RISR)
RIS Phuket  : (RISP)

RIS has a total of four Campus during 2022

Notable students or alumni
Golf & Mike - Singer and actor
Nicole Theriault - Singer
Cris Horwang - Actress
Sutatta Udomsilp - Actress
Rirkrit Tiravanija - Artist
Phuwin Tangsakyuen - Actor

References

External links

 Ruamrudee International School on the International Schools Association of Thailand

International Baccalaureate schools in Thailand
Educational institutions established in 1957
International schools in Bangkok
1957 establishments in Thailand
American international schools in Thailand
Private schools in Thailand